Bastorf is a municipality  in the Rostock district, in Mecklenburg-Vorpommern, Germany.

References

External links 
 http://www.bastorf.de